Corymbia ligans is a species of tree that is endemic to north-eastern Queensland. It has rough bark on the trunk and branches, narrow lance-shaped adult leaves, flower buds in groups of seven and elongated barrel-shaped fruit.

Description
It has rough, tessellated, greyish bark on the trunk and branches. The flowering time and flower colour have not been recorded. The fruit is a woody elongated barrel-shaped capsule with the valves enclosed in the fruit.

Taxonomy and naming

Distribution and habitat
This eucalypt usually grows in shallow soil on stony or sandy hills mostly near Greenvale, The Lynd, Einasleigh and the Newcastle Range.

See also
 List of Corymbia species

References

ligans
Myrtales of Australia
Flora of Queensland
Plants described in 1995